Joseph John Papike (March 28, 1914 – May 14, 1967) was a professional ice hockey player who played 20 games in the National Hockey League. Born in Eveleth, Minnesota, he played for the Chicago Black Hawks.

External links 

Joe Papike's profile at Hockey Reference.com

1914 births
1967 deaths
American men's ice hockey right wingers
Baltimore Orioles (ice hockey) players
Chicago Blackhawks players
Ice hockey players from Minnesota
Sportspeople from Eveleth, Minnesota